Aubette de Meulan (literally Aubette of Meulan) is a French river that begins at Avernes in Val-d'Oise, flows through Vigny, and empties into the Seine in Meulan-en-Yvelines. One commune is named after this river: Tessancourt-sur-Aubette (Yvelines).

References

Rivers of France
Rivers of Île-de-France
Rivers of Val-d'Oise
Rivers of Yvelines